The 1989 NCAA Division I-A football season ended with Miami winning its third National Championship during the 1980s, cementing its claim as the decade's top team, winning more titles than any other program.

Notre Dame signed a six-year, $30 million deal with NBC, granting the network the exclusive rights to broadcast Notre Dame football. However, the deal would not start until 1991.

Florida State began 0–2 but finished the season 10–2, having beaten the National Champions Miami earlier in the season and beating Nebraska in the Fiesta Bowl.

Oklahoma coach Barry Switzer resigned June 19 after 16 seasons, during which he led the Sooners to three national championships (1974, 1975, 1985).

Michigan coach Bo Schembechler retired following the season. Steve Spurrier was hired by Florida away from Duke in an effort to clean up after a decade of NCAA sanctions.

Houston quarterback Andre Ware ran the run and shoot offense all the way to the Heisman Trophy and numerous records.

Rule changes
Use of a kicking tee for field goals and extra points is prohibited, repealing a rule put forth in 1948; all such kicks must now be made off the ground.
Five-yard delay of game penalties will be enforced on home teams when crowd noise is too loud for opponents to hear signals.

Conference and program changes
One team upgraded from Division I-AA and one resumed play after being suspended for two seasons, thus increasing the number of Division I-A teams from 104 to 106.
Louisiana Tech upgraded from Division I-AA as an independent
The SMU Mustangs of the Southwest Conference resumed play in the wake of the program's "death penalty".

Regular season

September
For the first time, the AP Poll ranked 25 teams rather than the previous 20. The first poll of the year featured Michigan at No. 1 and defending champion Notre Dame at No. 2, followed by No. 3 Nebraska, No. 4 Miami, and No. 5 USC.

August 31-September 4: No. 1 Michigan, No. 3 Nebraska, and No. 4 Miami were idle. No. 2 Notre Dame defeated Virginia 36-13 in the Kickoff Classic, but No. 5 USC blew a late 13-0 lead and lost 14-13 to No. 22 Illinois. No. 8 Auburn, who was also idle this week, moved up in the next poll: No. 1 Notre Dame, No. 2 Michigan, No. 3 Miami, No. 4 Nebraska, and No. 5 Auburn.

September 9: No. 1 Notre Dame was idle, and No. 2 Michigan still had not begun their season. No. 3 Miami opened with a 51-3 domination of Wisconsin, No. 4 Nebraska beat Northern Illinois 48-17, and No. 5 Auburn shut out Pacific 55-0. The top five remained the same in the next poll.

September 16: For the fifth consecutive year, there was a regular-season game between the AP’s top two teams. And for the second year in a row Notre Dame was the winner of that matchup, as the No. 1-ranked Fighting Irish defeated No. 2 Michigan 24-19 thanks to Rocket Ismail’s two kickoff returns for touchdowns. Meanwhile, No. 3 Miami beat California 31-3, No. 4 Nebraska won 42-30 over Utah, and No. 5 Auburn defeated Southern Mississippi 24-3. The top five in the next poll were No. 1 Notre Dame, No. 2 Miami, No. 3 Nebraska, No. 4 Auburn, and No. 5 Michigan.

September 23: No. 1 Notre Dame defeated Michigan State 21-13, No. 2 Miami won 38-7 at Missouri, and No. 3 Nebraska shut out Minnesota 48-0. No. 4 Auburn was idle. No. 5 Michigan needed a late touchdown and a buzzer-beating field goal to beat No. 24 UCLA 24-23, and the Wolverines fell out of the top five in the next poll. No. 6 Colorado did not play this weekend, but they met with a tragedy as quarterback Sal Aunese (who was also coach Bill McCartney’s son-in-law) died of stomach cancer. The Buffaloes moved up in the next poll: No. 1 Notre Dame, No. 2 Miami, No. 3 Nebraska, No. 4 Auburn, and No. 5 Colorado.

September 30: No. 1 Notre Dame beat their third straight Big Ten opponent, winning 40-7 at Purdue. Michigan State had to play a top-two team for the second week in a row, and the Spartans fell 26-20 to No. 2 Miami. No. 3 Nebraska defeated Oregon State 35-7, but No. 4 Auburn lost 21-14 at No. 12 Tennessee. Just days after Aunese’s funeral, No. 5 Colorado traveled to Seattle and won 45-28 over No. 21 Washington. No. 6 Michigan beat Maryland 41-21 to move back into the top five: No. 1 Notre Dame, No. 2 Miami, No. 3 Colorado, No. 4 Nebraska, and No. 5 Michigan.

October
October 7: No. 1 Notre Dame won 27-17 at Stanford, No. 2 Miami overwhelmed Cincinnati 56-0, No. 3 Colorado crushed Missouri 49-3, No. 4 Nebraska dominated Kansas State 58-7, and No. 5 Michigan blanked Wisconsin 24-0. The top five remained the same in the next poll.

October 14: No. 1 Notre Dame visited No. 17 Air Force and won 41-27. Gino Torretta, subbing for the injured Craig Erickson, set a school record with 468 passing yards in No. 2 Miami’s 48-16 win over San Jose State. No. 3 Colorado won 52-17 at Iowa State, No. 4 Nebraska beat Missouri 50-7, and No. 5 Michigan squeaked past No. 21 Michigan State 10-7. The top five again remained the same in the next poll.

October 21: No. 1 Notre Dame came back from a 10-point halftime deficit to pull out a 28-24 victory over No. 9 USC. No. 2 Miami was idle. No. 3 Colorado beat Kansas 49-17, No. 4 Nebraska won 48-23 at Oklahoma State, and No. 5 Michigan defeated Iowa 26-12. The top five once again remained the same.

October 28: No. 1 Notre Dame defeated No. 7 Pittsburgh 45-7. No. 2 Miami visited No. 9 Florida State, whom they had defeated 31-0 in 1988, and FSU took revenge with a 24-10 victory. No. 3 Colorado won 20-3 over Oklahoma; the Sooners were entering a down period after a series of off-field scandals and the forced resignation of longtime coach Barry Switzer. No. 4 Nebraska beat Iowa State 49-17, and No. 5 Michigan defeated Indiana 38-10. In a matchup between No. 6 Alabama and No. 14 Penn State, the Nittany Lions had the ball inside the one-yard line with 13 seconds left. Penn State coach Joe Paterno elected to go for a field goal rather than a touchdown, but the kick was blocked and Alabama won the game 17-16. The next poll featured No. 1 Notre Dame, No. 2 Colorado, No. 3 Nebraska, No. 4 Michigan, and No. 5 Alabama.

November-December
November 4: No. 1 Notre Dame shut out Navy 41-0. No. 2 Colorado made it two wins in two weeks against Big 8 powerhouses, preserving a 27-21 victory over No. 3 Nebraska with a last-second deflection in the end zone. No. 4 Michigan defeated Purdue 42-27, No. 5 Alabama beat Mississippi State 23-10, and No. 6 Florida State won 35-10 over South Carolina. The next poll featured No. 1 Notre Dame, No. 2 Colorado, No. 3 Michigan, No. 4 Alabama, and No. 5 Florida State.

November 11: No. 1 Notre Dame overwhelmed SMU 59-6, one of many blowout losses for the Mustangs in their first year back from a NCAA-imposed “death penalty” (they had allowed a record-setting 1,021 yards of offense in a 95-21 loss to Houston three weeks earlier). No. 2 Colorado won 41-17 at Oklahoma State to clinch the Big 8 title and a spot in the Orange Bowl; this was the first time since 1961 that a team other than Oklahoma or Nebraska had won an outright Big 8 championship. No. 3 Michigan visited No. 8 Illinois for a 24-10 victory, No. 4 Alabama defeated LSU 32-16, and No. 5 Florida State was idle. The top five remained the same in the next poll.

November 18: No. 1 Notre Dame won 34-23 at No. 17 Penn State. No. 2 Colorado finished an undefeated regular season with a 59-11 victory at Kansas State. No. 3 Michigan beat Minnesota 49-15, No. 4 Alabama defeated Southern Mississippi 37-14, and No. 5 Florida State won 57-20 over Memphis. The Pac-10 race was decided this weekend, as No. 9 USC topped No. 25 Arizona 24-3 to clinch a Rose Bowl berth. The top five again remained the same in the next poll.

November 25: Notre Dame’s most famous victory in their 1988 championship season was their upset of then-No. 1 Miami in the “Catholics vs. Convicts” game. This year’s rematch had the opposite result, as the No. 7-ranked Hurricanes upset the top-rated Fighting Irish 27-10. No. 2 Colorado had finished their schedule. No. 3 Michigan wrapped up the Big Ten championship and earned a Rose Bowl bid with a 28-18 defeat of No. 20 Ohio State, while No. 4 Alabama and No. 5 Florida State were idle. No. 9 Arkansas held off No. 14 Texas A&M 23-22 to win the SWC title and a spot in the Cotton Bowl. The next poll featured No. 1 Colorado, No. 2 Alabama, No. 3 Michigan, No. 4 Miami, and No. 5 Notre Dame.

December 2: No. 2 Alabama was undefeated going into the last game of the season, but a 30-20 loss to No. 11 Auburn in the Iron Bowl spoiled their perfect record and caused the two rivals to finish in a three-way tie for the SEC title with No. 8 Tennessee. Despite their loss, Alabama was picked to represent the conference in the Sugar Bowl. No. 6 Florida State finished their season with a ninth consecutive win after an 0-2 start, defeating Florida 24-17. The other major teams had already completed their schedules, and the final poll of the regular season featured No. 1 Colorado, No. 2 Miami, No. 3 Michigan, No. 4 Notre Dame, and No. 5 Florida State.

As sometimes happened in the days before the NCAA had a formal process to pick the national champion, the title was affected by an early bowl game selection. Assuming that Notre Dame would defeat Miami and finish the season at the top of the poll, the Orange Bowl organizers set up what they hoped would be a No. 1 vs. No. 2 game between the Fighting Irish and Colorado. When Notre Dame dropped in the polls after their loss, the Orange Bowl ended up being No. 1 vs. No. 4 with other teams still in contention for the championship. Miami, the actual No. 2 team at the end of the season, ended up playing No. 7 Alabama in the Sugar Bowl. The other major matchups were No. 3 Michigan against No. 12 USC in the Rose Bowl, No. 5 Florida State against No. 6 Nebraska in the Fiesta, and No. 8 Tennessee against No. 10 Arkansas in the Cotton.

Conference standings

No. 1 and No. 2 progress

Notable rivalry games
Auburn 30 Alabama 20 First Iron Bowl Played in Auburn

Bowl games

Orange Bowl: No. 4 Notre Dame 21, No. 1 Colorado 6
Sugar Bowl: No. 2 Miami (FL) 33, No. 7 Alabama 25
Rose Bowl: No. 12 USC 17, No. 3 Michigan 10
Cotton Bowl: No. 8 Tennessee 31, No. 10 Arkansas 27

Other Bowls:
Fiesta Bowl: No. 5 Florida State 41, No. 6 Nebraska 17
Florida Citrus Bowl: No. 11 Illinois 31, No. 15 Virginia 21
Hall of Fame Bowl: No. 9 Auburn 31, No. 21 Ohio State 14
Gator Bowl: No. 14 Clemson 27, No. 17 West Virginia 7
John Hancock Bowl: No. 23 Pittsburgh 31, No. 16 Texas A&M 28
Copper Bowl: Arizona 17, NC State 10
Holiday Bowl: No. 18 Penn State 50, No. 19 BYU 39
Freedom Bowl: Washington 34, Florida 7
Peach Bowl: Syracuse 19, Georgia 18
All-American Bowl: No. 24 Texas Tech 49, No. 20 Duke 21
Liberty Bowl: Mississippi 42, Air Force 29
Aloha Bowl: No. 22 Michigan State 33, No. 25 Hawaii 13
Independence Bowl: Oregon 27, Tulsa 24
California Bowl: Fresno State 27, Ball State 6

Final AP poll

Miami (FL)
Notre Dame
Florida State
Colorado 
Tennessee
Auburn
Michigan
Southern California
Alabama
Illinois
Nebraska
Clemson
Arkansas
Houston
Penn State
Michigan State
Pittsburgh
Virginia
Texas Tech
Texas A&M
West Virginia
BYU
Washington
Ohio State
Arizona

Final Coaches poll
 Miami (FL)
 Florida St.
 Notre Dame
 Colorado
 Tennessee
 Auburn
 Alabama
 Michigan
 Southern California
 Illinois
 Clemson
 Nebraska
 Arkansas
 Penn St.
 Virginia
 Texas Tech
 Michigan St.
 Brigham Young
 Pittsburgh
 Washington

Heisman Trophy
Winner: Andre Ware, Houston, Jr. QB
Anthony Thompson, Indiana, Sr. RB
Major Harris, West Virginia, Jr. QB
Tony Rice, Notre Dame, Sr. QB
Darian Hagan, Colorado, So. QB

Other major awards
Maxwell (Player): Anthony Thompson, Indiana
Camp (Back): Anthony Thompson, Indiana
O'Brien Award (QB): Andre Ware, Houston
Rockne (Lineman): Chris Zorich, Notre Dame, NT
Lombardi (Linebacker): Percy Snow, Michigan St.
Outland (Interior): Mohammed Elewonibi, BYU
Coach of the Year: Bill McCartney, Colorado

References